The Finnish Television Academy (Televisioakatemia RY, which comprises MTV3, Yle, Sanoma and SATU ry) organizes the Golden Venla (Kultainen Venla) competition and gala. The Golden Venla Awards recognize the year's best Finnish television programs, their creators and performers. The Golden Venlas are voted on by members of the Academy - professionals working in the industry. It replaced the Venla award (1982-2010).

References

External links
 Kultainen Venla
 Televisioakatemia
 Kultainen Venla IMDB

Finnish television awards
Awards established in 2010